The Water House is one of the few remaining residential buildings that showcases Brazilian architectural style in Nigeria. The building is located in Kakawa street, downtown Lagos, Lagos Island and built in the 19th century during the era of the Lagos colony. It was owned and inhabited by Candido Da Rocha.

Gallery

References

Brazilian Nigerian
Houses in Lagos
Historic buildings and structures in Nigeria
Buildings and structures completed in the 19th century
19th-century establishments in Lagos
19th-century architecture in Nigeria